The 1969–70 FIBA European Champions Cup was the thirteenth installment of the European top-tier level professional basketball club competition FIBA European Champions Cup (now called EuroLeague). The Final was held at the Sportska Dvorana Skenderija, in Sarajevo, Yugoslavia, on April 4, 1970. It was won by Ignis Varese, who defeated CSKA Moscow, by a result of 79–74.

Competition system
24 teams (European national domestic league champions, plus the then current title holders), playing in a tournament system, played knock-out rounds on a home and away basis. The aggregate score of both games decided the winner.
The eight teams qualified for 1/4 Finals were divided into two groups of four. Every team played against the other three in its group in consecutive home-and-away matches, so that every two of these games counted as a single win or defeat (point difference being a decisive factor there). In case of a tie between two or more teams after the group stage, the following criteria were used to decide the final standing: 1) one-to-one games between the teams; 2) basket average; 3) individual wins and defeats.
The group winners and runners-up of the 1/4 Final round qualified for 1/2 Finals. The final was played at a predetermined venue.

First round

|}

*Union Radès Transport withdrew before the first leg and ASVEL received a forfeit (2-0) in both games.

Second round

|}

Automatically qualified to the group stage
 CSKA Moscow (title holder)

Quarterfinals group stage
The quarterfinals were played with a round-robin system, in which every Two Game series (TGS) constituted as one game for the record.

Semifinals

|}

Final
April 9, Sportska Dvorana Skenderija, Sarajevo

|}

Awards

FIBA European Champions Cup Finals Top Scorer
 Sergei Belov ( CSKA Moscow)

External links
 1969–70 FIBA European Champions Cup
 1969–70 FIBA European Champions Cup
 Final Game Details
 Final Game Details
 Champions Cup 1969–70 Line-ups and Stats

EuroLeague seasons
FIBA